Panionios B.C. (Greek: Πανιώνιος KAE), known in European competitions as Panionios Athens is the Greek professional basketball club that is based in Nea Smyrni, Athens, and that plays its home games in Palaio Faliro, Athens, Greece. The club is also widely known as Πανιώνιος Γυμναστικός Σύλλογος Σμύρνης, or Panionios Gymnastikos Syllogos Smyrnis, which is the Pan-Ionian Gymnastic Club of Smyrna. This is usually abbreviated to the club name of Πανιώνιος Γ.Σ.Σ. Panionios B.C. is the basketball department of the Panionios Gymnastic Club that is based in Nea Smyrni, Athens.

Panionios B.C. has been a long-time club of the top-tier level Greek Basket League, which is considered one of the best national domestic basketball leagues in Europe. Panionios B.C. has also competed in the European-wide top-tier level EuroLeague. For sponsorship reasons, the club has also been known as Panionios On Telecoms and Panionios Forthnet, as well as several other sponsorship names. 

Some of the well-known players that have played with the club over the years have included: Faidon Matthaiou, Takis Koroneos, Makis Dendrinos, Dimitris Fosses, Kostas Missas, Fanis Christodoulou, Giannis Giannoulis, Boban Janković, P. J. Brown, Panagiotis Giannakis, Henry Turner, Thurl Bailey, Travis Mays, Žarko Paspalj, Byron Dinkins, Mitchell Wiggins, Theo Papaloukas, Jure Zdovc, Laurent Sciarra, Nikos Chatzis, Georgios Sigalas, Angelos Koronios, Dimos Dikoudis, Nikos Oikonomou, Georgios Diamantopoulos, Stratos Perperoglou, Michalis Pelekanos, Ender Arslan,  Miloš Vujanić, Alex Stepheson, Errick McCollum, and Tyrese Rice, among others.

Logos

History

Early years
The basketball clubs' parent athletic union, the Panionios Gymnastic Club, was founded in 1890, in İzmir, Ottoman Empire (located today in the modern country of Turkey), making it one of the oldest sporting clubs in Europe. The sporting clubs' basketball department was founded in 1919. After the Greek military suffered defeat in the Greco-Turkish War in 1922, the club was transferred to the Athenian suburb of Nea Smyrni, in Greece.

The basketball department, Panionios B.C., began participation in the Greek Basket League starting in the 1928–29 season, and finished in second place in the league that year. Panionios B.C. finished in third place in the league the next year.

Rise of the club to prominence in Greek basketball
Panionios B.C. competed in the top-tier Greek basketball league, in consecutive years, from the 1981–82 season until the 2014–15 season. In the 1986–87 season, Panionios played in the championship finals series of the Greek League, losing out to Aris, and their two Greek basketball legends Nikos Galis and Panagiotis Giannakis (Giannakis would later go on to play for Panionios). In 1991, led by Fanis Christodoulou, the team won the Greek Cup title, by defeating PAOK by a score of 73–70. Panionios also played in the finals game of the Greek Cup in both 1977 and 1995. Ιn the 1993–94 season, after an exciting run in the European 3rd-tier level FIBA Korać Cup, and after scoring a couple of wins against Maccabi Tel Aviv in the quarterfinals, Panionios reached the semifinals, and played against PAOK Bravo. This marked the first civil conflict between Greek basketball clubs in European-wide competitions, ever.

The club finished in 3rd place in the Greek League in the 1995–96 season, under their head coach at the time, Dušan Ivković, and thus qualified to the EuroLeague for the 1996–97 season. In the FIBA EuroLeague 1996–97 season, the team was coached by Efthimis Kioumourtzoglou. Two years later, in 1999, Panionios once again reached the semifinals of the FIBA Korać Cup, where they were again eliminated, this time from the super favorites of the tournament, FC Barcelona, which featured Sasha Djordjević.

In the Greek League 2007–08 season, under the ownership of Elias Lianos, the founder of Proton Bank, Panionios, led by Ivan Zoroski, Giannis Kalampokis, and charismatic head coach Nenad Marković, finished in 3rd place in the Greek League. They came back from an 0–2 series deficit in the deciding best-of-five league third-place series against Maroussi, and won the series 3–2. That secured the team a place in the EuroLeague competition for the EuroLeague 2008–09 season. This marked the club's first EuroLeague appearance in more than a decade.

Decline of the club
After the 2014–15 season, Panionios was relegated to the Greek 2nd Division, after 33 consecutive seasons with a presence in the top-tier level Greek Basket League. For the 2015–16 season, Panionios preferred to play in the third-tier of Greece, the semi-pro level Greek B Basket League, due to financial difficulties. They were promoted up to the Greek 2nd Division for the 2016–17 season. 

They won the Greek 2nd Division title of the 2016–17 season, and were promoted back up to the top-tier level league, for the 2017–18 season. Due to financial difficulties, Panionios was demoted down to the Greek 3rd Division, prior to the 2020–21 season.

Panionios in international competitions

Arenas

Panionios played its domestic Greek League home games at "Artakis" Nea Smyrni Indoor Hall, a now demolished 1,832-seat arena that was owned by the Nea Smyrni municipality. They used the arena from its opening in 1979 to 2006, and from 2009 to its close in 2019. From 2006 to 2009, the club used the Helliniko Olympic Arena, which was built for the 2004 Summer Olympics, and has a capacity of 15,000, as its home arena. At various times, the club has also used the National Athletic Center Glyfada Makis Liougas, which has a capacity of 3,232.

In 2019, the club moved into the Sofia Befon Palaio Faliro Indoor Hall for the 2019–20 season. The arena seats 1,204 people. It was opened in 2017. 

The municipality of Nea Smyrni has begun the construction of a new modern-style multi-use indoor arena, called the Boban Janković Indoor Hall, named after Boban Janković, which is being built on the same location as the old Nea Smyrni Indoor Hall. The new arena is scheduled to be open for the 2022–23 season. The club will play at a smaller arena in Nea Smyrni neighborhood, Andreas Varikas Indoor Hall, until its new arena is completed.

Retired numbers

Honours and titles

Domestic competitions
 Greek League
 Runners-up (1): 1986–87
 Greek Cup
 Winners (1): 1990–91
 Runners-up (2): 1976–77, 1994–95
 Greek 2nd Division (1961–1986) / Greek 2nd Division (1986–present)
 Winners (3): 1973–74, 1980–81, 2016–17
 Greek 3rd Division
 Winners (1): 2015–16

 Greek National Categories Cup
 Winners (1): 2022–23

European competitions
 FIBA Korać Cup
 Semifinalist (2): 1993–94, 1998–99

Other competitions
 Athens, Greece Tournament
 Winners (1): 2011

International record

Season by season results

Notable players

Greece:
  Dimitris Agravanis
  Vangelis Angelou
  Ioannis Athanasoulas
  Ioannis Athinaiou
  Nikos Barlos
  Marios Batis
  Georgios Bogris
  Georgios Bosganas
  Nikos Chatzis
  Christos Christodoulou
  Fanis Christodoulou
  Makis Dendrinos
  Georgios Diamantopoulos
  Dimos Dikoudis
  Makis Dreliozis
  Dimitris Fosses
  Georgios Gasparis
  Ioannis Georgallis
  Panagiotis Giannakis
  Charis Giannopoulos
  Alexi Giannoulias
  Giannis Giannoulis
  Savvas Iliadis
 - Vlado Janković
  Panagiotis Kafkis
  Georgios Kalaitzis
  Giannis Kalampokis
  Andreas Kanonidis
  Georgios Karagkoutis
  Theodoros Karamanolis
  Vassilis Kavvadas
  Vassilis Kikilias
  Takis Koroneos
  Angelos Koronios
  Alexis Kyritsis
  Georgios Limniatis
  Nikos Linardos
  Antonis Mantzaris
  Dimitris Marmarinos
  Faidon Matthaiou
  Dimitris Mavroeidis
  Kostas Missas
  Nikos Oikonomou
  Theo Papaloukas
  Dimitris Papanikolaou
  Nikos Pappas
  Michalis Pelekanos
  Stratos Perperoglou
  Nondas Papantoniou
  Vangelis Sakellariou
 - Dušan Šakota
  Christos Saloustros
  Zisis Sarikopoulos
  Georgios Sigalas
  Alexandros Sigkounas
  Ioannis Sioutis
  Vangelis Sklavos
  Gaios Skordilis
  Dimitris Stamatis
  Tzanis Stavrakopoulos
  Vassilis Symtsak
  Christos Tapoutos
  Dimitris Verginis
  Vassilis Xanthopoulos

Europe:
  Stephen Arigbabu
  Ender Arslan
  Dejan Borovnjak
  Branko Cvetković
  Boris Dallo
  Uroš Duvnjak
  Zoran Erceg
  Vassil Evtimov
  Boban Janković
 - Dušan Jelić
  Gintaras Kadžiulis
  Antanas Kavaliauskas
  Dragan Lukovski
  Nenad Marković
  Guy-Marc Michel
  Vladimir Micov
  Goran Nikolić
  Žarko Paspalj
 - Miroslav Pecarski
 - Miroslav Raičević
 -  Tyrese Rice
  Joao Santos
  Laurent Sciarra
  Nikoloz Tskitishvili
  Kristaps Valters
  Jure Zdovc

USA:
  William Avery
  Thurl Bailey
  Toby Bailey
  Lonny Baxter
  Davion Berry
  Chris Booker
  P.J. Brown
  Travon Bryant
  T. J. Carter
  Mateen Cleaves
  Jon Diebler
  Byron Dinkins
  Joey Dorsey
  Ruben Douglas
  Muhammad El-Amin
  Luke Hancock
  Antonio Harvey
  Donnell Harvey
  John Hudson
  Andre Hutson
  Chris Jent
  Billy Keys
  Randolph Keys
  Mark Landsberger
  Kevin Langford
  Travis Mays
  Amal McCaskill
  Errick McCollum
  Jeff McInnis
  Gerry McNamara
  Landon Milbourne
  Aaron Miles
  Chris Owens
  Mark Payne
  Gabe Pruitt
  Rod Sellers
  Paul Shirley
  E. J. Singler
  Ed Stokes
  Jimmie Taylor
  Henry Turner
  John Wallace
  Travis Watson
  Mitchell Wiggins
  Kennedy Winston
  Rashad Wright

Rest of Americas:
 - Levon Kendall
  Samardo Samuels

Africa:
 - Chinemelu Elonu

Oceania:
  Brad Newley

Head coaches

Top players in games played and points scored in the Greek Basket League (since the 1992–93 season)
Panionios team leaders in games played and points scored, since the Greek Basket League became fully professional, starting with the 1992–93 season.
 Through the 2019–20 season.

{| class="wikitable float-left" 
! style="color:white; background:#E41B17;"|Rank
! style="color:white; background:#E41B17;"|Player
! style="color:white; background:#E41B17;"|Games Played
|-
| align="center" | 1.
|  Marios Batis
| align="center" | 174
|}

{| class="wikitable float-right" 
! style="color:white; background:#E41B17;"|Rank
! style="color:white; background:#E41B17;"|Player
! style="color:white; background:#E41B17;"|Points Scored
|-
| align="center" | 1.
|  Georgios Diamantopoulos
| align="center" | 2,676
|}

See also
 Panionios F.C.
 Panionios G.S.S.

References

External links 
Panionios B.C. Official Website 
Eurobasket.com Team Page 
Greek Basket League Team Page
EuroCup Official Team Page
Euroleague.net Panionios B.C. Team Profile
Panionios Panthers Club 

Basketball
 
Basketball teams in Attica
Nea Smyrni